Saxicola (Latin: saxum, rock + incola, dwelling in), the stonechats or chats, is a genus of 15 species of small passerine birds restricted to the Old World. They are insectivores occurring in open scrubland and grassland with scattered small shrubs.

Taxonomy
The genus was introduced by the German naturalist Johann Matthäus Bechstein in 1802. The type species was subsequently designated as the European stonechat. The name Saxicola is from Latin saxum, saxi "stone" and -cola "dweller".

The genus was formerly included in the thrush family Turdidae, but as with several other related genera, has now been shown to be correctly classified in the Old World flycatcher family Muscicapidae, in which it is most closely related to the genera Oenanthe (wheatears) and Campicoloides.

Genetic and behavioural evidence has also resulted in several new species being accepted in the genus in recent years, most notably the splitting of the former broad "species" common stonechat Saxicola torquatus into five species, a change now widely though not yet universally accepted. With addition of mtDNA cytochrome b sequence and nDNA fingerprinting data, it was confirmed that not only the Fuerteventura and Réunion stonechats are distinct species, but that in addition, the African, Madagascar, European, Siberian and Amur stonechats are also all separate species. Due to confusion of subspecies allocation, the name S. torquatus was briefly used for the European species, with the African stonechat being incorrectly listed as S. axillaris.

Owing to misunderstandings of Latin syntax, several species have in the past been widely but incorrectly cited with feminine name endings ("S. torquata, S. maura, S. leucura, S. ferrea", etc.).

Species
The following 15 species are currently accepted in Saxicola:
 Whinchat (Saxicola rubetra)
 White-browed bush chat (Saxicola macrorhynchus)
 White-throated bush chat (Saxicola insignis)
 Canary Islands stonechat (Saxicola dacotiae)
 European stonechat (Saxicola rubicola)
 Siberian stonechat (Saxicola maurus)
 Amur stonechat (Saxicola stejnegeri)
 African stonechat (Saxicola torquatus)
 Madagascar stonechat (Saxicola sibilla)
 Reunion stonechat (Saxicola tectes)
 White-tailed stonechat (Saxicola leucurus)
 Pied bush chat (Saxicola caprata)
 Jerdon's bush chat (Saxicola jerdoni)
 Grey bush chat (Saxicola ferreus)
 White-bellied bush chat (Saxicola gutturalis)

Formerly included in the genus Saxicola, but now treated in a separate genus:
 Splendid fairywren (as Saxicola splendens)
 Buff-streaked chat (as Saxicola bifasciatus)

Fossil record
 Saxicola lambrechti (Late Miocene of Polgardi, Hungary)  
Saxicola baranensis (Pliocene of Beremend, Hungary)
Saxicola parva (Pliocene of Csarnota, Hungary)
Saxicola magna (Pliocene of Beremend, Hungary)

References

External links

 
Bird genera